Mohbat Dero, is a town in Kandiaro Taluka of Naushahro Feroze District, Sindh, Pakistan. It is also the administrative headquarter of the Mohbat Dero  Union Council.

References

Kandiaro Taluka
Naushahro Feroze District
Union councils of Sindh